The Heckling Hare is a Merrie Melodies cartoon, released on July 5, 1941, and featuring Bugs Bunny and a dopey dog named Willoughby. The cartoon was directed by Tex Avery, written by Michael Maltese, animated by soon-to-be director Robert McKimson, and with musical direction by Carl W. Stalling. In a style that was becoming typical of the Bugs character, he easily outwitted and tormented his antagonist through the short, his only concern being what to do next to the dog.

This is the second-to-last Bugs Bunny cartoon directed by Tex Avery to be released following a dispute with producer Leon Schlesinger during production (see "Original Ending" below). The last, All This and Rabbit Stew, was produced before this film. Additionally, it was the fifth cartoon for Bugs and the 55th cartoon Avery directed at Warner Bros.

The Merrie Melodies opening sequence also featured the first usage of the Warner Bros. shield logo zooming in with a carrot-munching Bugs Bunny lying on top of it. Here, after the zoom-in and a couple of bites of his carrot, Bugs pulls down the Merrie Melodies title screen like it is a shade.

Plot

Instead of Elmer Fudd, Bugs is hunted by a dog named Willoughby, but the dog falls for every trap Bugs sets for him until they both fall off a cliff at the end.

Voice cast
Mel Blanc as Bugs Bunny
Kent Rogers as Willoughby the Dog

Home media
This cartoon appears in restored form on the DVD Looney Tunes Golden Collection: Volume 2. It is also included,  unrestored, on Looney Tunes Golden Collection: Volume 3 as part of the 1990 TV special What's Up Doc? A Salute to Bugs Bunny.

Original ending
This is the cartoon that led to Avery leaving Warner Bros. and moving to MGM. The final gag of this cartoon originally had Bugs and Willoughby falling off three cliffs, with Bugs telling the audience after the second tumble, "Hold on to your hats, folks. Here we go again!" during the third trip down. Schlesinger intervened for reasons that are not known with certainty. The most popular story is that the "Hold on to your hats" line referred to a euphemism that was then in circulation; another story is that Schlesinger feared that Tex Avery had killed off Bugs Bunny by ending the cartoon with Bugs and Willoughby falling off the second cliff without a clear indication of whether or not the two survived.

According to Martha Sigall, Schlesinger found the second fall to be repetitious and objected to its inclusion on those grounds. He instructed Avery to cut it, but Avery insisted that it should remain. Schlesinger simply overruled him as the boss. Karl F. Cohen suggests that Schlesinger found inappropriate an ending which suggests that Bugs gets killed. From Schlesinger's point of view the dispute was over his right to do as he pleased with the films he was paying for. From Avery's point of view, the dispute was over artistic interference.

The film was edited so that the characters only fall off a cliff once. After Bugs and Willoughby fall through the sky in a lengthy sequence, they "put on the brakes" and make a soft, feet-first landing on the ground. Bugs says to the audience, "N'yah, fooled you, didn't we?!" The dog follows with, "Yeah!" just as the cartoon fades out. Willoughby's line and the fade out to the end card are usually cut in TV versions (mostly those shown on the Ted Turner-owned cable networks TBS, TNT, Cartoon Network, and Boomerang) to cover up the fact that the cartoon had been edited in such an abrupt manner prior to release in theaters.

Avery was angry, and walked out of the studio. He was promptly suspended for four weeks with no pay. On July 2, 1941, the quarrel was reported in an article for The Hollywood Reporter. During his suspension, Avery was hired by Jerry Fairbanks at Paramount Pictures where he directed the first three Speaking of Animals shorts and later left for MGM. A similar line had been allowed in Daffy Duck and Egghead (1938, coincidentally also directed by Avery). Just before launching into his own take on The Merry-Go-Round Broke Down, Daffy Duck tells the audience, "Hold your seats, folks, here we go again!" Daffy also says "Here we go again!" at the end of Along Came Daffy (1947).

Sources

References

External links
 
 

1941 animated films
1941 comedy films
1941 films
1941 short films
1940s animated short films
1940s Warner Bros. animated short films
Animated films about dogs
Films directed by Tex Avery
Bugs Bunny films
Films produced by Leon Schlesinger
Films scored by Carl Stalling
Merrie Melodies short films
Warner Bros. Cartoons animated short films
Films with screenplays by Michael Maltese
1940s English-language films